Moore Township is an inactive township in Shannon County, in the U.S. state of Missouri.

Moore Township was erected in 1842, and named after Robert E. Moore, an early settler. The infamous Tri-State Tornado (which was likely a tornado family) was first sighted in the area and would cause around 700 fatalities across Missouri, Illinois, and Indiana.

References

Townships in Missouri
Townships in Shannon County, Missouri